The 2015 French Athletics Championships was the 127th edition of the national championship in outdoor track and field for France. It was held on 10–12 July at the Stadium Lille Métropole in Villeneuve-d'Ascq. A total of 38 events (divided evenly between the sexes) were contested over the three-day competition.

Results

Men

Women

References

Results
Les championnats de France 2015 

French Athletics Championships
French Athletics Championships
French Athletics Championships
French Athletics Championships
Villeneuve-d'Ascq
Sport in Nord (French department)